An artist is a person engaged in creating art or practicing the arts, especially the visual arts.

Artist or artiste may also refer to:

People
  (b. 1974/1975) politician from Suriname
 The Artist (Formerly Known As Prince), stage name of Prince (1958–2016), American musician
 Prince Iaukea or The Artist (born 1964), professional wrestler
Johnny Jebsen (1917–1945), World War II anti-Nazi German intelligence officer and British double agent (codename ARTIST)
 Lartiste (born 1985, as Youssef Akdim) French rapper

Places
 Artist Lake, a lake located in Middle Island, New York, United States

Stage, film, television, radio
 Artist (film), a 2013 Malayalam film 
 The Artist (film), a 2011 French film romance and Academy Award for Best Picture winner
 "The Artist" (episode), a live-action episode of The Super Mario Bros. Super Show!
 Artists (radio series), 2003 BBS radio programme
 Artists (film), 1928 German film

Literature
 The Artist (UK magazine), launched in 1931
 The Artist (Russian magazine), published in 1889-1895
 The Artist and Journal of Home Culture, or The Artist, an arts monthly published 1880–1902
 L'Artiste, a weekly illustrated review published in Paris from 1831 to 1904

Music
 Artist (EP), a 2012 EP by Teen Top
 L.E.S. Artistes (2008 song) a single by Santigold off the album Santogold

Other uses
 Café des Artistes (1917-2009) New York City, NY, USA; fine dining restaurant

See also

 
 
 The Artist's Magazine, magazine published in Cincinnati
 The Artists' Studio, community theatre in Indiana, United States
 Art (disambiguation)